The 2009 WGC-Bridgestone Invitational was a professional golf tournament held August  over the South Course at Firestone Country Club in Akron, Ohio. It was the eleventh WGC-Bridgestone Invitational tournament, and the third of four World Golf Championships events held in 2009.

World number 1 Tiger Woods won his 16th World Golf Championships title, which was his seventh Invitational title. This was his fourth Invitational title in as many starts, as he won three consecutive (2005, 2006, 2007) and missed the 2008 edition due to recuperation after leg surgery. He shot 268 (−12), four strokes ahead of runners-up Robert Allenby and Pádraig Harrington. This was Woods' 10th Invitational appearance and had yet to finish out of the top five; he was second in 2004 and fourth twice (2002, 2003).

Field
1. Playing members of the 2008 United States and European Ryder Cup teams
Chad Campbell, Paul Casey (3,4,5), Stewart Cink (2,3,4,5), Ben Curtis (3,4), Jim Furyk (2,3,4), Sergio García (3,4,5), Søren Hansen (3,4), Pádraig Harrington (3,4,5), J. B. Holmes, Miguel Ángel Jiménez (3,4), Anthony Kim (3,4), Justin Leonard (3,4), Hunter Mahan (2,3,4), Graeme McDowell (3,4), Phil Mickelson (2,3,4,5), Kenny Perry (3,4,5), Ian Poulter (3,4), Justin Rose, Henrik Stenson (3,4,5), Steve Stricker (2,3,4,5), Boo Weekley, Lee Westwood (3,4), Oliver Wilson (3,4)
Robert Karlsson (3,4,5) did not play.

2. Playing members of the 2007 United States and International Presidents Cup teams
Stuart Appleby, Woody Austin, Ángel Cabrera (3,4,5), K. J. Choi, Ernie Els (3,4), Lucas Glover (3,4,5), Retief Goosen (3,4,5), Charles Howell III, Trevor Immelman, Zach Johnson (3,4,5), Geoff Ogilvy (3,4,5), Nick O'Hern, Rory Sabbatini (3,4,5), Adam Scott (3,4), Vijay Singh (3,4,5), David Toms (3,4), Scott Verplank, Mike Weir (3,4), Tiger Woods (3,4,5)

3. Top 50 players from the Official World Golf Rankings two weeks prior to event
Robert Allenby (4), Tim Clark (4,5), Luke Donald (4), Gonzalo Fernández-Castaño (4,5), Ross Fisher (4), Brian Gay (4,5), Mathew Goggin (4), Dustin Johnson (5), Shingo Katayama (4), Martin Kaymer (4,5), Søren Kjeldsen (4,5), Davis Love III (4,5), Rory McIlroy (4,5), Sean O'Hair (4,5), Álvaro Quirós (4,5), Jeev Milkha Singh (4,5), Camilo Villegas (4,5), Nick Watney (4,5)

4. Top 50 players from the Official World Golf Rankings one week prior to event
Thongchai Jaidee (5)

5. Winners of Federation tournaments since the prior year's tournament with an Official World Golf Ranking Strength of Field Rating of 115 points or more
Cameron Beckman, Christian Cévaër, Darren Clarke, Nick Dougherty, Nathan Green, Grégory Havret, Anthony Kang, Jerry Kelly, Danny Lee, Shane Lowry, Prayad Marksaeng, Pat Perez, Carl Pettersson, Richard Sterne, Marc Turnesa, Yang Yong-eun
Lin Wen-tang did not play.

6. The winner of selected tournaments from each of the following tours:
Japan Golf Tour: Japan Golf Tour Championship (2009) – Yuji Igarashi
PGA Tour of Australasia: Australian PGA Championship (2008) – Geoff Ogilvy, already qualified through categories 2, 3, 4, and 5
Sunshine Tour: Vodacom Championship (2009) – Anders Hansen
Asian Tour: Volvo Masters of Asia (2008) – Lam Chih Bing

Past champions in the field 

Source:

Round summaries

First round
Thursday, August 6, 2009 

Source:

Second round
Friday, August 7, 2009 

Source:

Third round
Saturday, August 8, 2009 

Source:

Final round
Sunday, August 9, 2009 

Source:

Scorecard
Final round

Cumulative tournament scores, relative to par

Source:

References

External links
Full results

WGC Invitational
WGC-Bridgestone Invitational
WGC-Bridgestone Invitational
WGC-Bridgestone Invitational